The Ferrari F310, and its evolution, the F310B, were the Formula One racing cars with which the Ferrari team competed in the  and  seasons. It was driven in both years by Michael Schumacher and Eddie Irvine.

This was the first Ferrari Formula One car to run on Shell fuel since the 1970s.

F310

The F310 proved to be a front-running car, but without the outright pace or superb reliability which led to the Williams FW18s dominating 1996.  Schumacher was able to win three Grands Prix, but the F310's shortcomings were shown by Irvine's run of eight consecutive retirements, most of them mechanical, as well as three straight double retirements. Schumacher was realistic about his aims for the season, saying that he hoped to win a few races before challenging for the title in 1997. Development also proved troublesome, with the cars having to use the  car's parts early in the season whilst structural problems were cured.

This car was notable as being the first Ferrari F1 car to use the then more conventional V10 engine format, because a V10 engine offered the best compromise between power and fuel efficiency; the V12 was powerful but thirsty, and the V8 lacked the straightline speed of the V10. The name F310 refers to the engine type, a 3 litre, 10 cylinder (V10) - a nomenclature consistent with that used for Ferrari's F1 cars from 1966 to 1980 (the 312, 312B and 312T), and similar to that used for the 2006 Ferrari 248. The engine was also called the 310. It was engineered by former Honda technician Osamu Goto.

Initially, the F310 was the only car in the 1996 field to have a low nose section, with the other teams having all switched to the more aerodynamically efficient high nose which was first seen on the 1990 Tyrrell 019. The high cockpit sides were meant to aid cooling and aerodynamics but in fact had the opposite effect. From the start, however, chief designer John Barnard had announced his intentions to design a high nose for the car, saying that the F310 would be an ongoing project with the ultimate goal to win the world championship. The high nose was eventually adopted permanently from the Canadian Grand Prix onwards. The F310 was the first F1 car to feature the dashboard gauges mounted to the steering wheel. In an interview in 2012, Irvine said he did not have fond memories of the F310, calling it "an awful car", a "piece of junk", and "almost undriveable", as did John Barnard, who admitted that the car "wasn't very good". Schumacher himself, reflecting many years later on the F310, referred to it as "a parachute."

F310B

The F310B was better performing and much more reliable than its predecessor but suffered stability issues at the front of the car. A new front wing assembly introduced shortly after Brawn and Byrne joined the team improved the package.

Regardless, double-champion Michael Schumacher was true on his 1995 promise that "in 1996 we will win three grands prix, then in 1997 we will challenge for the championship" by taking the challenge to the last round. He was, however, unable to hold off a storming drive by title challenger Jacques Villeneuve; a botched attempt by Schumacher at defending his position ended up with him in the gravel, retired, and eventually disqualified from the 1997 season results. The team nonetheless retained their constructors' points.

In total, the F310 and F310B won eight Grands Prix, were on the podium 22 times, and achieved 7 pole positions and 172 points.

Other 

The car appears in the video game F1 2013 as one of the classic cars.

Complete Formula One results
(key) (results in bold indicate pole position; results in italics indicate fastest lap)

References

External links

F310
1996 Formula One season cars
1997 Formula One season cars